(born 20 December 1969) is a Japanese nordic combined skier who competed from 1994 to 1998. He won the 4 x 5 km team event at the 1995 FIS Nordic World Ski Championships in Thunder Bay, Ontario.

Ogiwara's best individual finish at the Winter Olympics was 6th at Nagano in 1998. He had two individual career victories (1993: 15 km individual, 1998: 7.5 km sprint).

He is the twin brother of Kenji Ogiwara, a fellow Japanese Nordic combined athlete.

External links

1969 births
Japanese male Nordic combined skiers
Living people
Nordic combined skiers at the 1998 Winter Olympics
Olympic Nordic combined skiers of Japan
People from Gunma Prefecture
Japanese twins
Waseda University alumni
Twin sportspeople
FIS Nordic World Ski Championships medalists in Nordic combined